The Battle of Mudki was fought on 18 December 1845, between the forces of the East India Company and part of the Sikh Khalsa Army, the army of the Sikh Empire of the Punjab. The British army won an untidy encounter battle, suffering heavy casualties.

Background
The Sikh Empire of the Punjab had been held together by Maharajah Ranjit Singh. Ranjit Singh had maintained a policy of friendship with the British East India Company, who held territories adjoining the Punjab, while at the same time building up the Khalsa, to deter aggression. When he died in 1839, the Sikh empire fell into increasing disorder. As several successive rulers and ministers were deposed or murdered, the army expanded and became increasingly restive. To secure their hold on power, some of the leaders in the Punjab goaded their army into a war against the British.

The Governor General of the Bengal Presidency (and in effect, of all British-controlled India) was Sir Henry Hardinge. Receiving reports of the disorder in the Punjab, he wrote late in 1845, "... it is evident that the Rani and the Chiefs are for their own preservation, endeavouring to raise a storm which, when raised, they will be powerless to direct or allay." He increased the British military force on the borders of the Punjab, stationing a division of 7,000 at Ferozepore, and moving other troops to Ambala and Meerut.

The Sikh Khalsa Army began the war by crossing the Sutlej River, which marked the frontier between the Punjab and British territory on 10 December 1845.

British Advance
The main British and Bengal Army, under its commander-in-chief, Sir Hugh Gough, began marching rapidly from its garrisons at Ambala and Meerut towards Ferozepur. Although the march took place in India's cold weather season, the troops were enveloped in choking dust clouds and water and food were short. Hardinge accompanied the army, waiving his right to command.

The British reached Mudki,  from Ferozepur in the afternoon of 18 December. Having commandeered grain from the village, they began preparing their first proper meal for some days. An advance guard of the Sikh army, commanded by Lal Singh, Vizier of the Sikh Empire, spotted the British cooking fires and advanced. The terrain was a flat sandy plain, with occasional villages and patches of scrub.

Battle

In the late evening the Sikh guns opened fire. As 30 of Gough's light guns replied, the Sikh cavalry tried to outflank both flanks of Gough's army. Although the irregular cavalry, the Gorchurras, were the elite of the Khalsa, and individually very skilled (for example, being able to spear a tent-peg out of the ground at full gallop), they were comparatively ineffective against the disciplined British and Bengal units. A counter-charge by a British light dragoon regiment cut down many Sikh gunners, but in turn suffered heavy casualties from the Sikh infantry.

After the initial cavalry actions, the British and Bengal infantry advanced. In the gathering darkness and the clouds of smoke and dust, the advance quickly became disordered. Some Bengal infantry regiments caused casualties among the British units with confused fire. Although outnumbered five to one, the Sikh Fauj-i-Ain (regulars) resisted desperately, and their gunners kept firing volleys of grapeshot until they were overrun.

Eventually, after two hours of darkness, the last Sikhs were driven from the field. The British returned to their camp. The British army was unused to fighting or manoeuvering at night and the battle was nicknamed "Midnight Mudki".

Casualties among British senior officers were heavy. Among those were two brigade commanders: "Fighting Bob" Sale, who was mortally wounded and died on 21 December, and John McCaskill. Another senior officer killed was Major George Broadfoot, formerly the British representative to the Punjab and now on Hardinge's staff.

Results

By itself, the battle decided little. It did however confirm Hardinge in the belief that Gough was too bull-headed and unimaginative to command the army. The two officers would clash several times over strategy during the war.

On the Sikh side, it was alleged that Lal Singh had fled the battlefield early, although there was little scope for direction once the battle had been joined.

Order of battle

British regiments
3rd King’s Own Light Dragoons
9th Foot
31st Foot
50th Foot
80th Foot

Indian regiments
The Governor General’s Bodyguard
4th Bengal Light Cavalry
5th Bengal Light Cavalry
Skinner’s Horse
8th Irregular Cavalry
9th Irregular Cavalry
2nd Bengal Native Infantry
16th Bengal Native Infantry
24th Bengal Native Infantry
26th Bengal Native Infantry
42nd Bengal Native Infantry
45th Bengal Native Infantry
47th Bengal Native Infantry
48th Bengal Native Infantry
73rd Bengal Native Infantry

Notes

Sources

External links
BritishBattles.com

Battles involving the United Kingdom
Battles of the Anglo-Sikh wars
History of Punjab, India
Battle of Mudki
December 1845 events
Mudki